William A. Le Sage (20 January 1927 – 31 October 2001) was a British pianist, vibraphonist, arranger, composer and bandleader.

Early life
Le Sage was born in London on 20 January 1927. His father, William (1899-1951) was a drummer and his two uncles were both musicians (George - trumpet, saxophone and Ernie - guitar). He started playing the ukulele at the age of eight, and drums at fifteen. He was self-taught as a pianist.

Later life and career
Le Sage's career began in 1945, after he had returned to London after being an evacuee in Sussex, when he led a sextet. He was then a member of army bands while serving with the Royal Signals. He played piano for the Johnny Dankworth Seven in March 1950, but soon switched to vibraphone. He left in 1954 to join the various small groups led by the drummer Tony Kinsey, with whom he stayed until 1961. He then joined baritone sax player Ronnie Ross, with whom he co-led various line-ups until 1966. During this period, Le Sage also played with Kenny Baker's Dozen. He began writing music for television and films.

During the 1960s, Le Sage was with Jack Parnell's ATV orchestra, the Chris Barber Band, and led his group, Directions in Jazz. His composer credits included scores for the films The Tell-Tale Heart (1960), Tarnished Heroes (1961), The Silent Invasion (1961), Strip Tease Murder (1963) and The Court Martial of Major Keller (1964).

He accompanied visiting American musicians, including guitarist Tal Farlow, with whom he struck up a close musical partnership, on an annual basis. In 1969, he formed the Bebop Preservation Society quintet, which he continued for more than two decades. Le Sage also worked with Barbara Thompson's Jubiaba and others.  During the 1990s, he occasionally played with pianist Tony Lee's group on vibraphone.

He died in London on 31 October 2001.

Discography 
 Presenting The Bill Le Sage – Ronnie Ross Quartet (1963)
 Cleopatra's Needle (1968) 
 Live at the Bull – Tribute Vols. 1–2 (2007)

References

External links
Le Sage discography

1927 births
2001 deaths
British jazz vibraphonists
English jazz pianists
British male jazz musicians
Musicians from London
English film score composers
English male film score composers
Royal Corps of Signals soldiers
20th-century British Army personnel
20th-century British male musicians